Daniel Drucker may refer to:

 Daniel J. Drucker (born 1956), professor of medicine
 Daniel C. Drucker (1918–2001), mechanical engineer